the Telstra National Aboriginal and Torres Strait Islander Art Awards features a main prize plus six category prizes, with a total prize pool of :
 Telstra Art Award – 
 Telstra General Painting Award 
 Telstra Bark Painting Award
 Telstra Works on Paper Award
 Wandjuk Marika 3D Memorial Award
 Telstra Multimedia Award
 Telstra Emerging Artist Award

Telstra Art Award 
The award was named the Telecom Australia First Prize from 1991 until 1995..

1984 Second and third prizes

Telstra General Painting Award 
First awarded in 1985, then not awarded again until 1995 when it was called the Telstra Open Painting until 2000, when the name was changed to the Telstra General Painting Award.

Telstra Works on Paper Award

Telstra Bark Painting Award

Wandjuk Marika 3D Memorial Award (sponsored by Telstra) 
This award is named after notable bark painter Wandjuk Marika. It was previously known as the Memorial Award for Mawalan’s Eldest Son from until 1993.

Telstra Emerging Artist Award 
The Telstra Youth Award was established in 2014 and was redeveloped into the Telstra Emerging Artist Award in 2017.

Telstra People's Choice Award 
This prize was established in 2007.

Telstra Multimedia Award
This award was established in 2018.

 2018: Patrina Liyadurrkitj Mununggurr, for Dhunupa'kum nhuna wanda (Straightening your mind)

 2019: Gutiŋarra Yunupiŋu, for Yolŋu sign language (Clan language – Dhuwalandja)

 2020: Siena Mayutu Wurmarri Stubbs, for Shinkansen

 2021: Pedro Wonaeamirri, for Jilarti
 2022: Jimmy John Thaiday (from Erub, Torres Strait Islands), for Beyond the Lines, a video work

Discontinued awards

Museums & Art Galleries Award
This prize was first awarded in 1986 and was discontinued in 1995.

Rothmans Foundation Award 
The Rothmans Foundation Award was established in 1987 and discontinued in 1994.

Peter Stuyvesant Cultural Foundation Award

Open Media Award

References

Further reading

1984 establishments in Australia
Awards established in 1984
Awards honoring indigenous people
Organisations serving Indigenous Australians
Australian art awards
Australian Aboriginal art